Hirudobdella is a genus of annelids belonging to the family Hirudinidae.

Species:

Hirudobdella antipodum 
Hirudobdella benhami

References

Annelids